Persatuan Sepakbola Tegal (simply known as Persegal) is an Indonesian football club based in Tegal, Central Java. They currently compete in the Liga 3 and their homeground is Yos Sudarso Stadium.

References

External links

Football clubs in Indonesia
Football clubs in Central Java
Association football clubs established in 1970
1970 establishments in Indonesia